First Lady of North Macedonia is the title attributed to the wife of the president of North Macedonia. The country's current first lady is Elizabeta Gjorgievska, wife of President Stevo Pendarovski, who has held the position since May 12, 2019. There has been no first gentleman of North Macedonia to date.

First ladies of North Macedonia

References

North Macedonia
Macedonian women in politics

mk:Прва Дама на Македонија